World Hydrography Day, 21 June, was adopted by the International Hydrographic Organization as an annual celebration to publicise the work of hydrographers and the importance of hydrography.

Origins

The International Hydrographic Bureau was established in 1921 for the purpose of providing a mechanism for consultation between governments on such matters as technical standards, safe navigation and the protection of the marine environment. In 1970 the name was changed to the International Hydrographic Organization (IHO). The IHO is actively engaged in developing standards and interoperability, particularly in relation to the challenges brought about by digital technologies.

In 2005 the IHO adopted the concept of a World Hydrography Day, which was "welcomed" by the United Nations General Assembly in Resolution A/RES/60/30 Oceans and the law of the sea.

The date chosen for World Hydrography Day is the anniversary of the founding of the International Hydrographic Organization.

Purpose

World Hydrography Day was adopted, in the words of the UN, with the aim of:

Translation of this aim through World Hydrography Day is achieved by the nomination of a theme for each year's celebration. Once a theme is agreed, the IHO Member States, international and national hydrographic organisations and services develop activity programs and events that highlight the annual theme.

Commemoration

A theme for each World Hydrography Day is determined by the Member States of the International Hydrographic Organization and is intended to promote the importance of hydrography internationally, multilateral cooperation and effective collaboration in data exchange, charting and standards development.

The theme for 2022 is: "Hydrography - contributing to the United Nations Ocean Decade"

Previous themes were:
2022: Hydrography - contributing to the United Nations Ocean Decade
2021: 100 years of international cooperation in hydrography
2020: Hydrography enabling autonomous technologies
2019: Hydrographic information driving marine knowledge
2018: Bathymetry - the foundation for sustainable seas, oceans and waterways
2017: Mapping our seas, oceans and waterways - more important than ever
2016: Hydrography - the key to well-managed seas and waterways 
2015: Our seas and waterways - yet to be fully charted and explored
2014: Hydrography - much more than just nautical charts
2013: Hydrography - underpinning the Blue Economy
2012: International Hydrographic Cooperation - supporting safe navigation
2011: Human Resources - The important element to the success of hydrography
2010: Hydrographic Services - the essential element for maritime trade
2009: Hydrography - Protecting the marine environment
2008: Capacity Building, a vital tool to assist the IHO in achieving its mission and objectives
2007: Electronic Navigational Charts (ENCs); an essential element of safety at sea and efficient maritime operations

Activities

Member states of the IHO, as well as international and national hydrographic organisations and services worldwide, engage in a range of activities on or around 21 June each year to mark World Hydrography Day. These include:

Awards
Conferences 
Seminars
Workshops
Lectures
Dinners
Public events
Demonstrations
Promotional material

References

External links
World Hydrography Day

Hydrography
Awareness days
June observances